Bazan or Bazán may refer to:

Places 
Bazan, Iran, in Mazandaran Province, Iran
Bazan Rural District, in Kermanshah Province, Iran
Bazán, Ciudad Real, a Spanish village formed by Francoist Spain's Instituto Nacional de Colonización
, a village in Ruse Municipality, Bulgaria

Other uses 
Navantia, formerly Bazán or IZAR, a Spanish shipbuilding firm
Oil Refineries Ltd, an Israeli oil refining company
David Bazan, a musician
Osvaldo Bazán (1934-1997), Argentine chess player
Bazan (surname), people with the surname Bazan

See also 
 Basan (disambiguation)